Otiorhynchus atroapterus is a species of weevil native to Europe.

References

Curculionidae
Beetles described in 1775
Beetles of Europe
Taxa named by Charles De Geer